Catalin Tecuceanu (born 9 September 1999), is a Romanian born Italian middle-distance runner.

Career
In 2008, he arrived in Italy from Romania joining his parents already arrived there.
In 2021, setting in Savona his personal best in the 800 m with 1:44.93 he also achieved the entry standard for the participation in the 2022 World Athletics Championships in Eugene, Oregon.

Curiosity
Italian citizen since November 2021, and eligible to represent Italy in national competitions from 9 March 2022, with a time of 1:45.24 on 800 m set in Ostrava he also established the 10th best Italian all-time performance over distance, in fact his previous time of 1:44.93, established in 2021, was a Romanian record as the athlete at that time could only represent Romania.

Statistics

National records
Romanian records
 800 m: 1:44.93 ( Zagreb, 14 September 2021)

Achievements

National titles
Tecuceanu has won 3 national championships.

Italian Athletics Championships
800 m: 2022
Italian Indoor Athletics Championships
800 m: 2022, 2023

See also
List of Romanian records in athletics
Italian all-time top lists - 800 metres

Notes

References

External links
 

1999 births
Living people
Athletics competitors of Fiamme Oro
Italian male middle-distance runners
Naturalised citizens of Italy
Romanian emigrants to Italy
Athletes (track and field) at the 2022 Mediterranean Games
Mediterranean Games competitors for Italy
Mediterranean Games medalists in athletics
Mediterranean Games bronze medalists for Italy